TrueCar, Inc. is an automotive pricing and information website for new and used car buyers. The service allows users to see what others paid for any new or used vehicle in their local area and receive upfront prices from a network of over 15,000 TrueCar Certified Dealers. TrueCar is paid by dealerships so they can be introduced to and communicate with potential new and used car buyers. TrueCar reports its users  purchase approximately 1 million cars from dealers in its network each year. The company is headquartered in Santa Monica, California, with a sales office Austin, TX.

History

2005–2010: Early years 
TrueCar was originally incorporated under the name "Zag.com Inc." in Delaware in February 2005. Scott Painter and Tom Taira, along with other co-founders, started the business to provide white-label auto-buying programs to affinity groups. The company's initial partner was Capital One in order for its customers to arrange financing, access upfront pricing, and locate inventory online. Other TrueCar co-founders include Jim Nguyen, Oded Noy, and Bernie Brenner.

After a year of development, Scott Painter and Tom Taira introduced TrueCar during the Techcrunch's Startup Battlefield in September 2008, launching it as a separate company from Zag.com. TrueCar gathers automotive retail transaction data from thousands of sources in order to enable consumers "to see what's paid" on any vehicle in the US. The two companies merged in 2010.

2011–2014: Pre-IPO 
In January 2011, TrueCar released ClearBook, a used vehicle index that analyzes the used car market in the same way TrueCar did for new cars. In May 2011, TrueCar acquired News Corp-backed Honk.com, a social car shopping platform.

In late 2011, TrueCar launched a television advertising campaign with commercials promoting its services. Shortly thereafter, TrueCar faced backlash from the automotive industry, when several state agencies and regulators notified TrueCar that its practices were noncompliant with some state laws. In response to those notices, TrueCar overhauled its pricing structure, and moved from a pay-per-sale model to a performance-adjusted subscription model for dealers in some states.

In August 2011, TrueCar purchased ALG, a company that provides information on future residual values of vehicles, for an estimated $83 million. In January 2012, TrueCar announced a three-year, exclusive partnership with Yahoo! for $150 million. TrueCar took over Yahoo's automotive properties and replaced it with their own solution.

TrueCar launched the first all-female racing team in 2012, with support from Penske Media Corporation and Dragon Racing. In June 2012, The Virgin Group announced its partnership in support of TrueCar's "Women Empowered" initiative.

On May 16, 2014, TrueCar became publicly traded on NASDAQ under the stock ticker symbol TRUE.

2015–2019: Chip Perry as CEO 
In December 2015, Scott Painter stepped down as CEO of TrueCar and was replaced by Chip Perry, the former CEO of AutoTrader.com. Under Perry, TrueCar's network of dealerships grew more than 24 percent quarterly over the prior year, as reported in July 2017. Perry invested heavily in a dealer sales team and altered the business model to be more attractive to dealers but less scalable for the business.

In 2015, 108 car dealerships sued TrueCar for false advertising of its non-negotiation policy and for violations of the Lanham Act. A federal judge dismissed the lawsuit in July 2019. Also in 2019, some investors in TrueCar sued the company for misleading shareholders. Separately, in December 2017, TrueCar and the California New Car Dealers Association settled a lawsuit that the association had brought against TrueCar in 2015. In its lawsuit, the association had alleged that TrueCar's billing model violated California law. As part of the settlement, TrueCar agreed to modify its billing model in California.

Shortly after disappointing first quarter results in 2019, TrueCar announced the immediate resignations of key senior executives, including CEO Chip Perry, CTO/CPO Tommy McClung, CMO Neeraj Gunsager, and EVP Brian Skutta.

2020–present 
In January 2020, the company launched a new brand identity and redesign. In May 2020, TrueCar announced a program focused on active military members designed to help offset its loss of the USAA Car Buying Service.

In May 2020, TrueCar announced a restructuring of the company, including layoffs of 30% of its workforce, in anticipation for significant revenue loss when its key partnership with USAA ends and the COVID-19 pandemic. Current senior leadership includes former USAA executive Christopher W. Claus, as Chairman; Michael Darrow, as President and CEO; Jantoon Reigersman, as CFO; and Jeffrey J. Swart, as General Counsel.

Capital investments
In its 2008 Series A round of venture funding, TrueCar raised $2.8 million from Zag's original investors. It received $8.1 million in Series B investments from Capital One and Anthem Venture Partners.

In September 2011, TrueCar raised $200 million in funding from USAA, GRP Partners, Keating Capital, Silicon Valley Bank and Capricorn Investment Group.

Truecar raised $30 million from Vulcan Capital in December 2013. Shortly after going public, TrueCar completed a secondary offering in November 2014 worth approximately $125 million.

See also
Kelley Blue Book

References

External links

Automotive websites
Companies listed on the Nasdaq
Retail companies established in 2005
Internet properties established in 2005
Used car market